Ruben Alexander Michael Sammut (born 26 September 1997) is a professional footballer who last played as a midfielder for  club Dulwich Hamlet. He was born in England and has represented Scotland up to the U21 level.

Club career
Born in Maidstone, England, Sammut joined the Chelsea Academy in 2004 and went on to make his U18 debut in March 2013. Following this, he quickly became a regular in Chelsea's academy sides, featuring in both their UEFA Youth League and FA Youth Cup successes in 2015 and 2016. Despite rumours suggesting Sammut was to leave the club following the conclusion of the 2017–18 campaign, he signed a new one-year deal in June.

On 19 June 2018, following his contract extension, Sammut agreed to join Scottish Championship club Falkirk on a season-long loan. On 14 July 2018, he made his professional debut during Falkirk's Scottish League Cup defeat against Montrose, featuring for the full 90 minutes in the 1–0 loss.

Sammut signed for League One club Sunderland in July 2019 following a trial. He made no first-team appearances, and was released at the end of the season.

Sammut moved on to National League South club Dulwich Hamlet. Whilst at Dulwich, Sammut returned to Chelsea, to take on a role as an academy scout and analysis intern. Sammut featured just eight times in all competitions, before leaving the club following a disrupted 2020–21 campaign due to the COVID-19 pandemic.

International career
Sammut is eligible to represent England and Malta at international level in addition to Scotland. He has featured for Scotland from the U16 to U21 levels.

Selected for the Scotland under-20 squad in the 2017 Toulon Tournament. The team went to claim the bronze medal. It was the nations first ever medal at the competition.

Career statistics

Honours
Chelsea
 FA Youth Cup: 2013–14, 2014–15, 2015–16
 UEFA Youth League: 2014–15, 2015–16

References

External links

1997 births
Living people
Sportspeople from Maidstone
English footballers
Scottish footballers
Scotland youth international footballers
Scotland under-21 international footballers
Association football midfielders
Chelsea F.C. players
Falkirk F.C. players
Dulwich Hamlet F.C. players
Scottish Professional Football League players
National League (English football) players
English people of Scottish descent
English people of Maltese descent
Scottish people of Maltese descent